Artemisia michauxiana is a North American species of wormwood in the sunflower family. It is known by the common names Michaux's wormwood and lemon sagewort. It is native to the western United States and Canada. It grows in mountain talus habitats in subalpine to alpine climates.

Artemisia michauxiana is a rhizomatous perennial herb with green, lemon-scented foliage. The plant grows up to 100 cm (40 inches) tall with several erect branches. The leaves are divided into many narrow segments which are hairless or lightly hairy and bear yellowish resin glands. The inflorescence is a spike up to 15 centimeters long full of clusters of small flower heads. Each head is lined with rough purplish green, glandular phyllaries and generally contains pale pistillate and disc florets. The fruit is a tiny hairless achene.

References

External links
Calflora Database: Artemisia michauxiana (Lemon sagewort,  Michally sagewort)
Jepson Manual eFlora (TJM2) treatment of Artemisia michauxiana
University of Washington, Burke Museum of Natural History and Culture
Plants for a Future 
Turner Photographics, Wildflowers of the Pacific Northwest 
Eastern Washington University, Flora of Eastern Washington and Adjacent Idaho
Paul Slichter, Sageworts, Mugworts and Wormwoods: The Genus Artemisia in the Columbia River Gorge of Oregon and Washington, Lemon Sagewort, Michaux Mugwort  Artemisia michauxiana

michauxiana
Flora of the Northwestern United States
Flora of Western Canada
Flora of California
Flora of Nevada
Flora of Utah
Flora of the Great Basin
Plants described in 1833
Taxa named by Wilibald Swibert Joseph Gottlieb von Besser
Flora without expected TNC conservation status